Geoffrey Verweij (born 10 August 1982, in Amsterdam) is a Dutch footballer who currently plays as a striker for FC Chabab in the Dutch Topklasse. He formerly played for Sparta Rotterdam, Haarlem, FC Emmen and IJsselmeervogels.

References
 Voetbal International Profile

1982 births
Living people
Dutch footballers
Sparta Rotterdam players
HFC Haarlem players
FC Emmen players
Eerste Divisie players
Derde Divisie players
Footballers from Amsterdam
Association football forwards